{{taxobox
| image = Tadehagi triquetrum.jpg
|regnum = Plantae
|unranked_divisio = Angiosperms
|unranked_classis = Eudicots
|unranked_ordo = Rosids
|ordo = Fabales
|familia = Fabaceae
|subfamilia = Faboideae
|genus = Tadehagi
|species = T. triquetrum
|binomial = Tadehagi triquetrum
|binomial_authority = (L.) H. Ohashi
|synonyms = *Desmodium triquetrum (L.) DC.  
Desmodium triquetrum subsp. genuinum Prain 
Desmodium triquetrum subsp. triquetrumHedysarum triquetrum L. Meibomia triquetra (L.) Kuntze Pteroloma triquetrum (L.) Benth. Tadehagi triquetrum subsp. triquetrum|}}

The Trefle Gros, (Tadehagi triquetrum), is a species of flowering plant in the legume family, Fabaceae. It belongs to the subfamily Faboideae. The species has two subspecies with the nominate one, but sometimes they given full species status by some authors. The maximum height of this shrub tree is 3m. Leaves alternate, linear-oblong, ovate with a tapering tip. Flowers show raceme inflorescence type, which are small, pale purplish in color. The fruit is a hairy legume. It is widespread in all South Asian, East Asian, and Southeast Asian countries.

SubspeciesTadehagi triquetrum alatum (DC.) H.Ohashi  Tadehagi triquetrum auriculatum'' (DC.) H.Ohashi

Common Names

Assamese - Ulucha 
Kannada - Dodotte, Molada gida 
Malayalam - Adkhapanal, Chattagai, Kattarali 
Marathi - Kak Ganja (काक गांजा )
Mizo - Arhrikreh
Myanmar(Burma) - လောက်သေရွက်,လောက်မင်းရွက်, ရွှေဘူသံလျှက်
Sinhalese - Bâloliyâ (බාලොලියා)
Telugu - Dammidi (దమ్మిడి )
Thai - Khao Mao Nok (ข้าวเม่านก)
Vietnamese - cây Cổ bình, cây Mũi mác

References

Four new prenylated isoflavonoids in Tadehagi triquetrum
A new lignan with hypoglycemic activity from Tadehagi triquetrum

Faboideae
Plants described in 1753
Taxa named by Carl Linnaeus
Fabales of Asia